Lucha Libre AAA Worldwide (AAA) is a professional wrestling promotion based in Mexico City. Title reigns are either determined by professional wrestling matches or are awarded to a wrestler, as a result of the culmination of various scripted storylines.

Overview
Currently in AAA, there are ten total active championships - four men's singles championships, a traditional men's tag team championship, a mixed tag team championship, a men's trios championship, a championship for female wrestlers, a championship for midget wretlers, and a specialty singles championship that can be held by both male and female wrestlers. 

11 wrestlers officially hold the championships (with one vacancy and one wrestler holding two championships). The list includes the number of times the wrestler has held the title, the date and location of the win, and a description of the winning bout.

Men's singles
At the top of AAA's championship hierarchy is the AAA Mega Championship. Title that currently belongs to Hijo del Vikingo, who defeated Samuray del Sol, Jay Lethal, Bobby Fish and Bandido in a five-way match on December 4, 2021 at Triplemanía Regia II that would determine the new champion due to multiple injuries to former champion Kenny Omega.

The secondary title is the AAA Latin American Championship. The title is currently held by first time champion Taurus, who won a three-way match over Octagón Jr. and Villano III Jr. on May 1, 2021 at  Rey de Reyes  to win the vacant championship. Previous champion Daga had relinquished the title due to leaving AAA.

The AAA World Cruiserweight Championship is for male wrestlers 231 lbs. and under. Laredo Kid is the current champion who won former champion Sammy Guevara at AAA TV-Taping on February 16, 2019. (Although Lio Rush defeated Laredo Kid on February 10, 2021 in a match where Rush's MLW World Middleweight Championship was also on the line. the AAA didn't recognized the title change and kept recognizing Laredo Kid as champion since 2019).

The La Leyenda Azul Blue Demon Championship	is a secondary title created to celebrate AAA Hall of Famer Blue Demon. The championship is defended yearly, with the winner of the annual match being recognized as the official champion – similar to the original version of the IWGP Heavyweight Championship or Chikara's Young Lions Cup. The current champion is Arez who defeated Taurus and Villano III Jr. in a three-way match to win the inaugural championship at Noche de Campeones on December 28, 2022.

Tag team
The AAA World Tag Team Championship is the primary tag team title in AAA.  The current champions are FTR (Cash Wheeler and Dax Harwood). They defeated former champions Los Lucha Bros (Pentagón Jr. and Fénix) at AEW Dynamite on October 16, 2021.

The AAA World Trios Championship is for three-man teams.  The titles are currently held by Los Mercenarios (La Hiedra, Rey Escorpion and Texano Jr.), They defeated Jinetes del Aire (El Hijo del Vikingo, Golden Magic and Myzteziz Jr.) at Luchando por la Identidad de Mexico on May 8, 2021.

The AAA World Mixed Tag Team Championship is for teams consisting of one male and one female wrestler. The current champions are the Los Vipers (Arez and Chik Tormenta), They defeated former champions Lady Maravilla and Villano III Jr. at AAA TV-Taping on October 11, 2021.

Women
There is one championship contested for female wrestlers (promoted as their Reinas del Ring division), Taya Valkyrie is the current champion, she defeated former champion Deonna Purrazzo at Rebellion on April 23, 2022.

Specialty
The AAA World Mini-Estrella Championship is for those classified as midget wrestlers (Mini-Estrellas or "minis"). Second time title holder Dinastía is the current champion, having defeated previous champion Mini Psycho Clown, Mini Monster Clown, Mini Murder Clown, La Parkita and La Parkita Negra in a six-way match at the Vive Latino house show on March 16, 2019.

The Marvel Lucha Libre Championship is a championship that can be held by both male and female wrestlers; wrestlers holding the championship portray comic book characters as part of a relationship between AAA and Marvel. The current champion is Aracno who defeated Engañoso, Gran Mazo, El Leyenda Americana, Picadura Letal, and Terror Púrpura in a tournament final to win the inaugural championship at Noche de Campeones on December 28, 2022. The "Aracno" character has been portrayed by multiple wrestlers, it is uncertain what wrestler was portraying the character during the championship match.

Current champions

See also
List of Lucha Libre AAA Worldwide personnel

References

 
AAA current